Soeratin Cup is an Indonesian football competition for players under the age of eighteen. Previously the competition was sponsored by Indofood and was called Liga Indofood.

Soeratin name used as the name for the dedicated this championship trophy as a tribute to one of the main founder and the chairman of the Football Association of Indonesia (PSSI).

The participants of this competition comes from all junior clubs from all board members to thirty-four local football associations throughout Indonesia.

Competition format 

The competition begins with a competition at the district and the city that is held simultaneously across the board football union branches throughout Indonesia. The best team drives the next round of competition at the provincial level.

This provincial competition follows the best teams from each competition that is held by the Indonesian football union branch manager in the area of the province. The competition is held by the Indonesian football association board area. Two to four best teams from every province of this round advance to the regional level or the level of the island.

The competition level of this region is held in six regions of northern Sumatra, southern Sumatra, Java-Bali, Kalimantan (Borneo), Sulawesi and eastern Indonesia (Nusa Tenggara Maluku Papua). A total of thirty two teams qualify for the national level.

National competition is held by the board Indonesian youth development section. This competition will produce future players for the Indonesia national football team.

Champions

Under-18 (1965–2011)

Under-17 (2012–present)

Under-15 (2017–present)

Under-13 (2022–present)

References

External links
Official website 

 
Football cup competitions in Indonesia
Youth football competitions